Katherine Vandam Bornstein (born March 15, 1948) is an American author, playwright, performance artist, actor, and gender theorist. In 1986, Bornstein started identifying as gender non-conforming and has stated "I don't call myself a woman, and I know I'm not a man" after having been assigned male at birth and receiving sex reassignment surgery.
Bornstein now identifies as non-binary and uses the pronouns they/them and she/her. Bornstein has also written about having anorexia, being a survivor of PTSD and being diagnosed with borderline personality disorder.

Biography

Early life
Bornstein was born in Asbury Park, New Jersey, into an upper middle-class Conservative Jewish family of Russian and Dutch descent. Bornstein studied Theater Arts with John Emigh and Jim Barnhill at Brown University (Class of '69). Bornstein joined the Church of Scientology, becoming a high-ranking lieutenant in the Sea Org, but later became disillusioned and formally left the movement in 1981. Bornstein's antagonism toward Scientology and public split from the church have had personal consequences; Bornstein's daughter, herself a Scientologist, no longer has any contact per Scientology's policy of disconnection.

Transition and post-op
Bornstein never felt comfortable with the belief of the day that all trans women are "women trapped in men's bodies." They did not identify as a man, but the only other option was to be a woman, a reflection of the gender binary, which required people to identify according to only two available genders. Another obstacle was the fact that Bornstein was attracted to women. She had sex reassignment surgery in 1986.

Bornstein settled into the lesbian community in San Francisco, and wrote art reviews for the gay and lesbian paper The Bay Area Reporter. Over the next few years, they began to identify as neither a man nor a woman. This catapulted Bornstein back to performing, creating several performance pieces, some of them one-person shows. It was the only way that she knew how to communicate life's paradoxes.

Bornstein also teaches workshops and has published several gender theory books and a novel. Hello Cruel World was written to keep "teens, freaks, and other outlaws" from dying by suicide. "Do whatever it takes to make your life more worth living," Bornstein writes, "just don't be mean." In a May 2018 interview with the LGBTQ&A podcast, they said that they no longer have thoughts of suicide since writing the book. 

Bornstein's partner is Barbara Carrellas. They live in New York City with three cats, two dogs, and a turtle.

Cancer diagnosis
In August 2012, Bornstein was diagnosed with lung cancer. Doctors thought that they were cancer-free after surgery, but it emerged in February 2013 that the disease had returned. Laura Vogel, a friend of theirs, launched a GoFundMe campaign on March 20 to help fund the cancer treatment. In December 2015, Bornstein announced that they had been cancer-free for two years.

Later years 
Bornstein made their Broadway debut in July 2018 in the play Straight White Men.

Speaking to the LGBTQ&A podcast in July 2021, Bornstein talked about how her view of gender evolved during the COVID-19 pandemic, "Gender became inconsequential to me while I was in quarantine and grappling with old age...This is where you really need to be letting go of shit. I'm letting go of the ability to be cute, in certain ways. I'm too old for that. My face is sagging, my boobs are sagging. Boy, oh boy. They're down to my waist and you let go of that as being necessary to your gender."

Works
In 1989, Bornstein created a theatre production in collaboration with Noreen Barnes, Hidden: A Gender,  based on parallels between their own life and that of the intersex person Herculine Barbin, starring Bornstein and Justin Vivian Bond. In 2009, Bornstein's Hello, Cruel World: 101 Alternatives to Suicide for Teens, Freaks, and Other Outlaws was a Lambda Literary Award Finalist for LGBT Nonfiction and Honorbook for the Stonewall Children's and Young Adult Literature. Bornstein edited Gender Outlaws: The Next Generation in collaboration with S. Bear Bergman. The anthology won Lambda Literary and Publishing Triangle Awards in 2011. Bornstein's autobiography, titled A Queer and Pleasant Danger: A Memoir, was released May 2012, and in April 2013, they released My New Gender Workbook: A Step-by-Step Guide to Achieving World Peace Through Gender Anarchy and Sex Positivity. Recently, Bornstein has taken part in a theatrical tour in England. She also took part in being a cast member in the reality TV show of I Am Cait.

Books
 
 
 
 
 
  A documentary Kate Bornstein is a Queer and Pleasant Danger, directed by Sam Feder, was released in 2014

Bornstein, Kate (2016). Gender Outlaw: On Men, Women, and the Rest of Us (Revised and Updated). New York: Vintage Books, a division of Penguin Random House LLC. .

Performance pieces
 Kate Bornstein Is a Queer and Pleasant Danger
 The Opposite Sex Is Neither
 Virtually Yours
 Hidden: A Gender
 Strangers in Paradox
 y2kate: gender virus 2000
 Hard Candy

References

Further reading

 An Interview with Kate Bornstein and S. Bear Bergman.

External links
 
Lecture given by Kate Bornstein on 01/03/2007

1948 births
Living people
20th-century American novelists
21st-century American novelists
American people of Dutch-Jewish descent
American people of Russian-Jewish descent
American performance artists
Brown University alumni
American former Scientologists
Jewish American artists
Jewish American writers
Lambda Literary Award winners
LGBT Jews
LGBT memoirists
LGBT people from New Jersey
American LGBT rights activists
American LGBT dramatists and playwrights
Novelists from New Jersey
People from Neptune City, New Jersey
People with borderline personality disorder
Non-binary dramatists and playwrights
Transgender artists
Transgender Jews
American non-binary writers